Spirit of the North is a third-person adventure game developed by Infuse Studio and published by Merge Games. It was released on May 7, 2020 for Windows and Nintendo Switch, and November 1, 2019 for PlayStation 4. It was re-released as Spirit of the North: Enhanced Edition for PlayStation 5, Xbox One, and Xbox Series X/S on November 26, 2020 and June 29, 2021 respectively. The game contains no dialog or narrative, and is about a fox that gains the powers of a spirit after collapsing from exhaustion. It received mixed reviews from critics, who praised its art design and soundtrack, but predominantly criticized its gameplay and visual performance. The Enhanced Edition received similar reviews, mainly on account of its controls and gameplay.

Reception 

The game received an aggregate score of 58/100 on Metacritic for its original Windows version, indicating "mixed or average reviews". Similarly, its Switch version received 59/100, and PlayStation 4 version, 67/100. The PlayStation 5 version received an aggregate score of 64/100.

Joe Keeley of Adventure Gamers gave the game's Windows version 2/5 stars, saying that while it looked and sounded good, it was largely "disappointing", calling the movement "imprecise and fiddly".

Ollie Reynolds of Nintendo Life gave the Switch version of the game 4/10 stars, comparing it to Journey in its execution, and praising its art style as "ambitious" and its soundtrack as "gorgeous". However, he said that its graphics suffered on Switch, and it had innate issues with the controls, saying that "the fox simply doesn't react to your inputs quickly enough" and calling jumping and swimming "infuriatingly sluggish".

Henry Stockdale of Push Square gave the PlayStation 5 version 7/10 stars, saying that while it looks "gorgeous", the Enhanced Edition neglected to improve the elements that most needed an update, calling the controls still "stiff" and the re-release a "wasted opportunity" to fix the game's original issues.

References

External links 

 Official website

2020 video games
Adventure games
Indie video games
Nintendo Switch games
PlayStation 4 games
PlayStation 5 games
Single-player video games
Video games about foxes
Video games developed in the United States
Video games set in Iceland
Windows games
Xbox One games
Xbox Series X and Series S games